Anna Báró (3 October 1920 – 23 October 1994) was a Hungarian stage, film, television and voice actress. She was known for her roles of Mrs. Tatár in the film Édes Anna, of Mrs. Alfréd Szekrényesi in the youth TV series of Keménykalap és krumpliorr (Bowler and Potato Nose), and of second-hand dealer Manci in the TV series Szomszédok.

She died in 1994, aged 74, in Budapest.

Filmography
Szomszédok (TV Series) (in the role of Manci – Second-hand Dealer) – 1988-1990
Kreutzer szonáta (TV Movie) – 1987
Lutra (in the role of Aunt Böske) – 1986
Linda (TV Series) (in the role of Mrs. Szabó) – 1986
Különös házasság (A Strange Marriage) (TV Mini-Series) (in the role of Mrs. Tóth) – 1984
Glória (TV Movie) – 1982
Vizipók-Csodapók (Waterspider Wonderspider) (Animated TV Series; voice) – 1982
Keménykalap és krumpliorr (Bowler and Potato Nose) (Youth TV Series) (in the role of Mrs. Alféd Szekrényesi) – 1978
Beszterce ostroma (The Siege of Beszterce) (TV Mini-Series) – 1976
 (TV Movie) (in the role of Rosa Kapturak) – 1971
Egy óra múlva itt vagyok (TV Mini-Series) (in the role of Mrs. Majzlik) – 1971
Igéző (TV Movie) – 1970
Csak egy telefon (in the role of a fat woman) – 1970
Régi nyár (Summer of Old Times) (TV Movie) – 1969 
7 kérdés a szerelemről (és 3 alkérdés) (TV Movie) (in the role of a passenger in the tramway) – 1969
Nem vagyunk angyalok (TV Movie) (in the role of Aunt Rozi) – 1967
Az orvos halála – 1966
Egy magyar nábob (A Hungarian Nabob) – 1966
Iszony – 1966
Butaságom története (Story of My Foolishness) (in the role of the wardrobe assistant) – 1965
A lóvátett város (TV Movie) (in the role of Mrs. Cox) – 1963
Csutak és a szürke ló (in the role of the Teamster) – 1961
Dúvad – 1961
Merénylet (in the role of the Cashkeeper) – 1960
A harangok Rómába mentek (The Bells Have Gone to Rome) – 1958
Édes Anna (in the role of Mrs. Tatár) – 1958
Vasvirág – 1958

External links 
 

1920 births
1994 deaths
Actresses from Budapest
Hungarian film actresses
Hungarian television actresses
Hungarian stage actresses
20th-century Hungarian actresses
Yugoslav emigrants to Hungary